Plague of Conscience is the second studio album from British Heavy metal band Savage Messiah, and their first release through Earache Records.

Production

The music and lyrics for the album were written by Dave Silver, and pre-production took place at Station Studios in London, England between August 2010 and June 2011.

The band recorded the album at Grindstone Studios in Suffolk, England between July and September 2011, once again working with producer Scott Atkins, who had worked with the band mixing and engineering their previous album, Insurrection Rising.

Release

The album was released on 23 February 2012 by Earache Records and made available in standard CD format, a limited run of 1,000 vinyl (400 on Black vinyl, 300 on Fear Red vinyl, 200 Radioactive Green vinyl, 100 Plague Pink vinyl) and for free download via Earache Records website. An official video for "All Seeing I" was released in December 2012.

Track listing

Personnel

 Dave Silver - Guitars and vocals
 Joff Bailey - Guitars
 Stefano Selvatico - Bass
 Mauricio Chamucero - Drums

References

2012 albums
Savage Messiah (band) albums